The Ghana Highway Authority (GHA) was established as a corporate body by GHA Degree 1974 (NRCD 298).
NRCD 298 was repealed by GHA Act 1997 (Act 540 ) which, however, continued the Authority in existence with responsibility for the administration, control, development and maintenance of the country's trunk road network totalling 13,367 km and related facilities. GHA's 13,367 km trunk roads make about 33% of Ghana's total road network of 40,186 km.

Departments
All the Divisions of the Authority are grouped under three main Departments, namely;
Administration Department
Development Department
Maintenance Department

Administration Department
This Department embraces 7 Divisions, namely;
 Finance,
 Human Resource
 Legal Service
 Training & Development
 Public Affairs
 MIS Division

There is an Internal Audit Division, that is directly responsible to the Chief Executive, but which for administration purposes, reports to the Deputy Chief Executive (Administration).

Development Department
This Department embraces 7 Divisions, namely;
Road Safety and Environment
Planning
Materials
Contracts
Quantity Surveying
Survey and Design
Bridges

The Head of this Department is the Deputy Chief Executive for Development.

Maintenance Department
This Department embraces;
Road Maintenance
Regional Offices (10 in all; one in each region)
Plant and Equipment

See also
 Ghana Road Network

References

Government agencies of Ghana
Roads in Ghana
Road authorities
Transport organisations based in Ghana